The Bophuthatswana Air Force (BAF) was the aviation branch of the Bophuthatswana Defence Force. The BAF existed from 1987 until 27 April 1994. The primary role of the BAF was to provide support and medevac services to the ground units of the Bophuthatswana army. The BAF operated from several bases, one being Mmabatho AFB.

All surviving aircraft and helicopters were integrated into the South African Air Force after 27 April 1994.

History
An air component of the BDF was established on 19 March 1981 with the purchase of an Alouette III from the South African Police. It was flown by Major De Villiers and Captain LaGrange of the SAAF, with Warrant Officer Strydom, ex-Rhodesian Air Force as Technical officer and Warrant Officer Viljoen of the South West African Police as Gunner and Navigator.

In 1982, the unit became known as Bophuthatswana Air Wing with the arrival of a 2 more Alouette IIIs and 2 Helio H-295s. In 1983, 2 Partenavia P.68s and an AS-355 Écureuil were purchased - the latter was assigned to VIP transports. In November 1989, it was replaced by an SA-365N1 Dauphin.
 
In 1985, a CASA 212-200 Aviocar was purchased to transport paratroopers, a CASA 212-300 was received in 1987. The 2 Helios were withdrawn from service and replaced by 2 MBB/Kawasaki BK 117s.

With the arrival of so many new aircraft, the Bophuthatswana Air Wing took the name Bophuthatswana Air Force in late 1987. In 1987 it was the first air unit in South Africa to train and commission Black pilot officers. The complement in 1988 was - 

Air Commodore Pretorius, Commander, ex-SAP Air Wing
Colonel De Villiers, Deputy Commander, ex-SAAF
Lt. Col. Taylor, ex-Rhodesian Air Force
Major Lagrange, ex-SAAF
Major DuPlooy, ex-Selous Scouts Navigator
Major Howell, ex-Rhodesian Air Force
Major van Niekerk, SWAPOL Air Wing
Captain van der Merwe, SAP Air wing 
Captain Strydom, ex-RhAF, Ground component (Base security & Comms)
Captain Nogomela, Ground component (Radar)
Captain Steyn, SAAF
Captain Etienne Bod,  ex SAAF
Captain Grobbelaar, SAP Air Wing
Captain Antonio Carvalho Pereira, ex-Portuguese Special Forces Navigator & Pararescueman
Captain Tswelopele
Lieutenant Semope
Lieutenant Viljoen, ex-SWAPOL Air Wing
Lieutenant Sims, ex-Rhodesian Air Force (Maintenance)
Drill Sergeant Major Tsolekile, ex-British South Africa Police, Training and Discipline
Warrant Officer Labuschagne, ex-SAAF (Maintenance & Radar)
Warrant Officer Pinto, ex-Grupos Especiais NCO from Portuguese Angola (Loadmaster, Training & Discipline)
Drill Sergeant Mutwa, ex-SWATF (Loadmaster & Base Security)
Drill Sergeant Badenhorst, ex-SADF (Base Security)
Drill Sergeant Kwape (Maintenance)
Sergeant Merafhe (Comms and Radar)
Sergeant Mudzwingwa, ex-Rhodesian African Rifles (Base Security and Training & Discipline)
Sergeant Powell, ex-BSAP (Base Security & Training).
+ 9 Corporals, 13 Lance Corporals and 19 Airmen for Maintenance, Radar & Base Security.

Aircraft

See also
South African Air Force

References

Flight Global: World's Air Forces (1990)
Frédéric Lert, Ainsi finit la Bophutatswana Air Force, magazine Le Fana de l'aviation'',  n° 300, November 1994

External links
Pilatus - Bophuthatswana Air Force (Bop Air Force)

Bophutatswana
Bophuthatswana
Disbanded air forces